Qhapaq Kancha (Quechua qhapaq noble, principal, mighty, kancha corral, "principal corral",  hispanicized spelling Ccapac Cancha) is an archaeological site in Peru of the Inca period on top of a mountain of the same name. It is located in the Cusco Region, Calca Province, Coya District.

References 

Archaeological sites in Peru
Archaeological sites in Cusco Region
Mountains of Peru
Mountains of Cusco Region